In systems theory, a realization of a state space model is an  implementation of a given input-output behavior.  That is, given an input-output relationship, a realization is a quadruple of (time-varying) matrices  such that
 
 
with  describing the input and output of the system at time .

LTI System
For a linear time-invariant system specified by a transfer matrix, a realization is any quadruple of matrices  such that .

Canonical realizations 
Any given transfer function which is strictly proper can easily be transferred into state-space by the following approach (this example is for a 4-dimensional, single-input, single-output system)):

Given a transfer function, expand it to reveal all coefficients in both the numerator and denominator. This should result in the following form:
.

The coefficients can now be inserted directly into the state-space model by the following approach:

.

This state-space realization is called controllable canonical form (also known as phase variable canonical form) because the resulting model is guaranteed to be controllable (i.e., because the control enters a chain of integrators, it has the ability to move every state).

The transfer function coefficients can also be used to construct another type of canonical form

.

This state-space realization is called observable canonical form because the resulting model is guaranteed to be observable (i.e., because the output exits from a chain of integrators, every state has an effect on the output).

General System

D = 0
If we have an input , an output , and a weighting pattern  then a realization is any triple of matrices  such that  where  is the state-transition matrix associated with the realization.

System identification

System identification techniques take the experimental data from a system and output a realization.  Such techniques can utilize both input and output data (e.g. eigensystem realization algorithm) or can only include the output data (e.g. frequency domain decomposition).  Typically an input-output technique would be more accurate, but the input data is not always available.

See also 

 Grey box model
 Statistical Model
 System identification

References

Models of computation
Systems theory